A Landesbischof is the head of some Protestant regional churches in Germany. Based on the principle of summus episcopus, after the Reformation each Lutheran prince assumed the position of supreme governor of the state church in his territory. After the First World War, all the German monarchies were abolished and in some regional churches a member of the clergy was elected as Landesbischof. 

Regional churches not using the term Landesbischof for their chairpersons, and often also allowing laypersons to take that office, use titles such as bishop (Bischof, only clergy), church president (Kirchenpräsident), praeses (Präses), state superintendent (Landessuperintendent, only clergy) or secretary (Schriftführer).

Churches with chairpersons titled Landesbischof
 Protestant Church in Baden, title used since 1933
 Evangelical Lutheran Church in Bavaria, title used since 1933
 Evangelical Lutheran State Church in Brunswick, title used since 1923
 Evangelical Lutheran State Church of Eutin (1921–1976, merged in the NEK), title used since 1961
 Evangelical Lutheran Church in the Hamburg State (1529–1976, merged in the NEK), title used since 1933
 Evangelical-Lutheran State Church of Hanover, title used since 1925
 Evangelical Lutheran Church in the Lübeck State (merged in the NEK in 1976), title used since 1934
 Evangelical Lutheran State Church of Mecklenburg (ELLM) (1933–2012, merged in the Evangelical Lutheran Church in Northern Germany), title used since 1933
 Evangelical Lutheran State Church of Mecklenburg-Schwerin (1850–1933, merged in the ELLM), title used since 1921
 Mecklenburg-Strelitz State Church (merged in the ELLM in 1933), title used since 1921
 Evangelical State Church in Nassau (1817–1934/1947, merged in the Protestant Church in Hesse and Nassau), title used from 1827 to 1882, and again from 1922 to 1934
 Evangelical Church in Middle Germany (EKM), title used since 2009
 Evangelical Lutheran Church in Northern Germany, Landesbischof since 2013
 Evangelical Church of the (old-Prussian) Union (1817–2003), title used between 1933 and 1935
 Evangelical Lutheran State Church of Saxony, title used since 1922
 Evangelical Lutheran State Church of Schaumburg-Lippe, title used since 1949
 Evangelical Lutheran State Church of Schleswig-Holstein (1866–1976; merged in the NEK), title used between 1933 and 1945
 Evangelical Lutheran Church in Thuringia (1920–2008; merged in the EKM), title used since 1933
 Evangelical State Church in Württemberg, title used since 1934

References 

 
Protestantism in Germany